Thomas Mostyn may refer to:

Sir Thomas Mostyn, 2nd Baronet (1651–1692), one of the Mostyn baronets
Thomas Mostyn (sea captain) (fl. 1695–1697), sea captain and slave trader
Sir Thomas Mostyn, 4th Baronet (1704–1758), British landowner and politician
Sir Thomas Mostyn, 6th Baronet (1776–1831), Welsh politician
Thomas Lloyd-Mostyn (1830–1861), British politician